Rajesh Kumar Bablu Bhaiya, is an Indian politician and elected as MLA in 2018 Madhya Pradesh Legislative Assembly election.

References

Year of birth missing (living people)
Living people
Madhya Pradesh MLAs 2018–2023
Samajwadi Party politicians from Madhya Pradesh
Indian National Congress politicians from Madhya Pradesh